Zvonko Ceklić (Cyrillic: Звонко Цеклић; born 11 April 1999) is a Montenegrin footballer who currently plays for Fortuna Liga club Zemplín Michalovce.

Club career

MFK Zemplín Michalovce
Ceklić made his Slovak league debut for Zemplín Michalovce in an away fixture against MFK Ružomberok on 11 February 2023.

References

External links
 MFK Zemplín Michalovce profile 
 
 
 Futbalnet profile 

1999 births
Living people
Sportspeople from Podgorica
Montenegrin footballers
Montenegro youth international footballers
Association football defenders
FK Zeta players
FC Turan players
MFK Zemplín Michalovce players
Montenegrin First League players
Kazakhstan Premier League players
Slovak Super Liga players
Montenegrin expatriate sportspeople in Kazakhstan
Expatriate footballers in Kazakhstan
Expatriate footballers in Slovakia
Montenegrin expatriate sportspeople in Slovakia